Omar Benson Miller (born October 7, 1978) is an American actor. He is known for his work as Walter Simmons on CSI: Miami (2009–2012), as Charles Greane on Ballers (2015–2019), as the voice of Raphael on Rise of the Teenage Mutant Ninja Turtles (2018-2020) and its 2022 film and on the CBS comedy series The Unicorn (2019–2021).

Early life
Miller was raised in Anaheim, California, and graduated from San Jose State University.

Miller is almost 6 ft 6 in (1,97 m) tall.

Career
Miller's biggest role was in the 2008 movie Miracle at St. Anna. He also has played minor roles in various television shows and movies, including Sex, Love & Secrets, American Pie Presents: Band Camp, Get Rich Or Die Tryin', 8 Mile, The Express: The Ernie Davis Story, Transformers, and  Shall We Dance. He was a CSI: Miami regular. Starting on October 5, 2009, he appeared on the crime drama as Walter Simmons, a Louisiana native and art theft specialist.

Filmography

Film and TV movies

Television

References

External links

Living people
African-American male actors
American male film actors
American male television actors
American male voice actors
21st-century American male actors
Male actors from Anaheim, California
Male actors from Long Beach, California
Male actors from Los Angeles
San Jose State University alumni
1978 births
21st-century African-American people
20th-century African-American people